Nordic combined at the 2012 Youth Winter Olympics was held at the Olympic Ski Jump at the Seefeld Arena in Seefeld, Austria on 14 and 16 January. The program consisted of just one event, however there was a mixed relay with Ski jumping athletes.

Medal summary

Medal table

Event

Qualification
20 athletes will qualify. Austria as the host nation is guaranteed one place, as are the six nations who scored points in the Marc Holder Trophy at the 2011 FIS Nordic Junior Ski Championship. The 14 remaining places were to have been distributed to countries in finishing order at the individual 5 km event at the 2011 FIS Nordic Junior Ski Championship, however, four places were unused and will be given as universality places. The maximum quota is one athlete per nation.

After the final reallocation only 17 countries were available for spots.

References

 
2012 Winter Youth Olympics events
2012 in Nordic combined
2012
Youth Olympics